Annulus fibrosus or anulus fibrosus may refer to:

Anulus fibrosus cordis, fibrous ring of heart
Anulus fibrosus disci intervertebralis, fibrous ring of intervertebral disk
Anulus fibrosus tympani, annulus surrounding the membrana tympani